Zilucoplan (development code RA101495) is a drug candidate being studied for use in the treatment of generalized myasthenia gravis and paroxysmal nocturnal hemoglobinuria.  It is currently in Phase III clinical trials.

Zilucoplan is a macrocyclic peptide that binds to the protein complement component 5 (C5) and inhibits its cleavage into C5a and C5b.

References 

Experimental drugs
Cyclic peptides